The Women's points race at the 2014 UCI Track Cycling World Championships was held on 1 March 2014. 19 cyclists participated in the contest, which was contested over 100 laps, equating to a distance of .

Medalists

Results
The race was started at 19:50.

References

2014 UCI Track Cycling World Championships
UCI Track Cycling World Championships – Women's points race